St Brigid's was a Roman Catholic church located in the Lower Town neighbourhood of Ottawa, Ontario, Canada. It was built to serve the English-speaking, Catholic population of the area. The church's closing was announced in 2006, and it was sold in 2007 and converted into an Irish-Canadian heritage centre. In 2022, it became the focus of a rent dispute involving The United People of Canada.

History
Until the opening of St Brigid's, this community, largely of Irish heritage, had formed part of the parish of Notre-Dame, the Cathedral of Ottawa. By 1870, the Irish percentage of the population had declined relative to that of the French Canadian. As a consequence, the Irish played an ever-diminishing role in the life and management of Notre-Dame.

Discussions to establish a distinct anglophone parish and church for Lower Town began in March 1888. A committee of parishioners from Notre-Dame Cathedral held meetings with the Archbishop of Ottawa, the Most Rev. Joseph-Thomas Duhamel. It was agreed to create a new parish; a site for the church chosen; and by May 3, 1888, James R. Bowes had been chosen as architect. The plans called for a substantial structure at the corner of St Patrick and Cumberland Streets. Built in the Romanesque Revival style (generally called Norman at that time), the principal façade has three heavy round headed portals and paired towers of unequal height and detail. The taller (eastern) tower is capped with a stylized bishop's mitre placing the church and its Irish parishioners squarely in the Ultramontanist tradition of the Catholic Church. Work began on St Brigid's in 1889 and the Blessing of the completed Church took place on August 3, 1890.

In May 2006, Archbishop Marcel Gervais announced that the church would be closed, as the shrinking congregation did not justify the several hundred thousand dollars in needed repairs. The parishioners objected vehemently to this and even took the archdiocese to court to keep it open, both unsuccessfully. One condition of the sale was that the building could not be used as a Catholic church, either by the buyers or their successors.

In 2007, St. Brigid's Catholic Church was put up for sale. The deconsecrated building was purchased by four investors in the fall of 2007 for $450,000. Patrick McDonald, one of the investors, renovated the building. It has been turned into Saint Brigid's Centre for the Arts, an Irish-Canadian heritage centre and social venue hosting art exhibitions, plays, and concerts.

Non-profit organisation The United People of Canada occupied and started the process purchasing Saint Brigid's Church in July 2022, and converted it into what it calls an "embassy". The conditional offer to buy the church subsequently fell though. After accumulating $10,000 of rent arrears and failing to provide proof of liability insurance, TUPOC was served an eviction notice on August 17, 2022 with bailiffs changing the locks on the 18th. On September 23, 2022, the Ontario Superior Court of Justice ruled that TUPOC had materially breached the sale agreement by failing to make required payments despite two extensions, granted the eviction application, and awarded $53,000 in damages to the owners. Director William Komer said that TUPOC would appeal, but would vacate the church in the meantime.

See also

 List of designated heritage properties in Ottawa

References
 
Ottawa: A Guide to Heritage Structures, Ottawa Local Architectural Conservation Advisory Committee
Exploring Ottawa, Harold Kalman and John Roaf
Capital Walks, Katharine Fletcher
Heritage Ottawa Newsletter, “J. Bowes & Son, Architects, Ottawa: A Forgotten Legacy”,  Elizabeth Krug
"The artful rebirth of St. Brigid's". Maria Cook, The Ottawa Citizen. Wednesday, April 2, 2008

External links

Ontario Heritage Trust St. Brigid's Church (City of Ottawa) - 1889-90 
Saint Brigid's Church historicplaces.ca

Roman Catholic churches in Ottawa
Designated heritage properties in Ottawa
Former Roman Catholic church buildings
Arts centres in Canada
Former churches in Canada
Canada convoy protest